The complete discography of the Argentine rock band Babasónicos.

Albums

Studio albums

B-sides albums

Remix albums

Soundtrack albums

Live albums

EPs albums

Discographies of Argentine artists
Rock music group discographies